Kjell Gustaf Svensson (born 10 September 1938) is a retired Swedish ice hockey goaltender. He competed at the 1960 and 1964 Olympics and finished in fifth and second place, respectively. He won the world title in 1962, finishing second in 1963 and 1967 and third in 1965. Nationally he won only one title, with Södertälje SK in 1956, but was selected to the Swedish all-star teams in 1960–61 and 1963–64.

After retiring from competitions Svensson worked as a coach with Södertälje SK in 1972 and 1975–78 and with the Swedish national team in 1973–74. Then he had a successful career with Scania AB, becoming Senior Vice-President of truck manufacturing. This career made him resign from his position on the board of directors of the Swedish Ice Hockey Association in 1986.

References

1938 births
Living people
Swedish ice hockey goaltenders
Olympic medalists in ice hockey
Olympic ice hockey players of Sweden
Olympic silver medalists for Sweden
Ice hockey players at the 1960 Winter Olympics
Ice hockey players at the 1964 Winter Olympics
Medalists at the 1964 Winter Olympics
People from Södertälje
Sportspeople from Stockholm County